General elections were held in the Netherlands on 6 May 1998. , they mark the last time a government headed by the Labour Party (PvdA) has been elected, or that that party won the popular vote and the most seats in the House of Representatives.

Introduction
During the 1998 election the purple coalition of social-democrats and liberals (left and right) fortified its majority. Both the social-democratic PvdA and the conservative liberal VVD won considerably, much at the cost of their junior partner in cabinet, the progressive liberal D66.

Political observers attributed the win to the economic performance of the coalition, including reduction of unemployment and the budget deficit, steady growth and job creation combined with wage freezes and trimming of the welfare state, together with a policy of fiscal restraint.

The two small left opposition parties, the green GroenLinks, and the socialist SP, were rewarded for their 'quality opposition'. The major opposition party, CDA, uncomfortable in its opposition role, also lost seats. The two parties for the elderly AOV and Unie 55+ and the rightwing populist CD did not return to parliament.

The formation resulted in the continuation of the Kok cabinet, with the second Kok cabinet (PvdA, VVD & D66).

Results

By province

References

Further reading

1998
1998 elections in the Netherlands
May 1988 events in Europe